Santa Rosa de Lima Parish Church is a Catholic church in Santa Rosa, Laguna, Philippines.

Rev. Fr. Mario P. Rivera serves as the current parish priest of the church.

History
The Santa Rosa de Lima Parish Church was built in the year 1792 with the arrival of Spanish Catholic priest, Francisco Favie. Both the church and the convent were completed within 12 years. It was blessed on August 4, 1812.

The first Mass was held on August 30, 1812, in honor of the patron saint, Rose of Lima, with Fray Francisco Favie, O.P the first parish priest. 

In 1970, Spanish friars built the present church building with labor from China who later became descendants of the old Chinese families in Santa Rosa including the Lijauco's and the Tiongco's. The old convent is now the main building of the Canossa School. 

Instead of "Bucol", the residents chose to name the town "Santa Rosa." The original building remains standing next to the Old Government Building and is known as Museo de Santa Rosa.

Features

Bells

The church has eight big bells that toll with sounds heard in distant barrios. Each bell is identified with a saint:

 Santa Rosa de Lima (the biggest bell)
 Santa Barbara
 Santissimo Sacramento
 San Juan Bautista
 San Jose
 Santa Cecilia
 Santo Domingo de Guzman
Niño Jesus

The patron's name, the name of the manufacturer, and his address, the priest then serving as curate, the year of casting, and the name of the donor (if any) are engraved on the bell.

Clock of the Old Façade

It was destroyed during a dogfight between the United States Air Force and the Imperial Japanese air forces, dismantling with it the statues of saints, specially those the church uses in processions during the Holy Week.

Paintings

Fray Andres Tejedor (Oct. 1916 – Feb. 1926), a Spanish priest of the Dominican Order, inspired Mariano Perlas Sr., an indigenous Santa Rosa painter during the early 20th century, to paint the ceiling of the church. It was a great attraction from 1923 to 1960. Among the paintings were the Assumption of the Blessed Virgin, the Coronation, the four Evangelists and Saint Roch.

During the time of Father Agustin Reyes (1957–1966) the paintings were removed when the ceiling was repainted during the renovation of 1960 because some pictures had been defaced by bats and time. The two paintings on the ceiling of the choir loft or "Koro", the image of the patron saints of Christian music – Holy King David with the harp and Saint Cecilia at the piano, are the only remnants of the more than a dozen paintings.

When Father Benito Pagsuyuin was the parish priest, some paintings that were rotting in the sacristy were assembled, and Dr. Pedro Rivera had them repainted. They were framed and displayed at the back part of the church.

See also
 Canossa School of Santa Rosa, Laguna
 Saint Rose of Lima

References

External links
 Santa Rosa de Lima Parish

Buildings and structures in Santa Rosa, Laguna
Roman Catholic churches in Laguna (province)
Churches in the Roman Catholic Diocese of San Pablo